Panousis is a Greek surname. Notable people with the surname include:

 Tzimis Panousis (1954–2018), Greek musician, stand-up comedian, and actor
 , Greek politician and government minister

Greek-language surnames